Timo Laitinen (born September 3, 1972, in Juuka) is a Finnish sport shooter. He competed at the 2000 Summer Olympics in the men's skeet event, in which he tied for 23rd place.

References

1972 births
Living people
Skeet shooters
Finnish male sport shooters
Shooters at the 2000 Summer Olympics
Olympic shooters of Finland